Teruyuki Hashimoto is a Japanese mixed martial artist. He competed in the Featherweight division.

Mixed martial arts record

|-
| Loss
| align=center| 0-3
| Tetsuo Katsuta
| Submission (Rear-Naked Choke)
| Shooto: R.E.A.D. 4
| 
| align=center| 1
| align=center| 4:29
| Setagaya, Tokyo, Japan
| 
|-
| Loss
| align=center| 0-2
| Kazuhiro Inoue
| Decision (Unanimous)
| Shooto: Gateway to the Extremes
| 
| align=center| 2
| align=center| 5:00
| Setagaya, Tokyo, Japan
| 
|-
| Loss
| align=center| 0-1
| Fumio Usami
| TKO (Punches)
| Shooto: Shooter's Soul
| 
| align=center| 2
| align=center| 0:46
| Setagaya, Tokyo, Japan
|

See also
List of male mixed martial artists

References

Japanese male mixed martial artists
Featherweight mixed martial artists
Living people
Year of birth missing (living people)